Ellis Green (12 April 1880 – 18 September 1936) was an English professional football outside left, who played in the Football League for Preston North End. He also captained Southern League club Brentford.

Career statistics

References 

1880 births
1936 deaths
People from Adlington, Lancashire
English footballers
Association football outside forwards
Association football wing halves
English Football League players
Southern Football League players
Chorley F.C. players
Colne F.C. players
Preston North End F.C. players
Brentford F.C. players